Landsberg (Lech) Schule station is a railway station in the municipality of Landsberg am Lech, in Bavaria, Germany. It is located on the Bobingen–Landsberg am Lech line of Deutsche Bahn.

Services
 the following services stop at Landsberg (Lech) Schule:

References

External links
 
 Landsberg (Lech) Schule layout 
 

Railway stations in Bavaria
Buildings and structures in Landsberg (district)